Weston-under-Redcastle is a small village and civil parish in Shropshire, England. It lies 10 km (6.2 miles) by road east of Wem.
At one end of the village is the main entrance to Hawkstone Park hotel and golf courses, and at the other end is a wood. 
Weston was mentioned in the Domesday Book, and part of the 1989 BBC adaptation of Prince Caspian was filmed in the village. It is under the south west edge of the Hawkstone Ridge.

The village
Weston has a Village Hall, and Maynard's Farm Shop mentioned in Rick Stein's Food Heroes of Britain.  Weston is home to the 18th century Hawkstone Park Hotel which has two golf courses, two restaurants, bars and award-winning Hawkstone Park Follies.

History

St Luke's Church
The Church of England church of St Luke dates back to 1791, built in the Gothic style but with a Georgian tower.

It is a Grade II listed building. It was originally a chapel of ease, attached to the parish of Hodnet, but is now a parish church. The red sandstone  building of 1791, on a medieval site, was mostly funded by Sir Richard Hill, 2nd Baronet of Hawkstone. It was restored in the late 19th century: this included the chancel, the gabled timber porch, stained glass, pews and octagonal font.

Domesday Book

Weston-under-Redcastle was called Westune in the 1086 Domesday Book; it was included in the Hundred of Hodnet within the county of Shropshire. The village had 21 households, which was considered quite large for the time, with total tax value of 3 geld units. In 1066 the value to the lord was £3; in 1086 it was £2. The village contained 3 villagers, 9 smallholders, 8 slaves and 1 rider. Weston had 8 plough lands, 2 lord's plough teams and one men's plough team. In 1066 the lord was Edric the Wild, and in 1086 it was Ranulf Peverel. The fifteen Shropshire hundreds mentioned in the Domesday Survey were entirely rearranged in the 1100-1135 reign of King Henry I, and the Hundred of Hodnet was merged before 1203 into the Hundred of Bradford. When Bradford was divided, Weston was in North Bradford.

Hawkstone Park

Hawkstone Park consists of 100 acres (40 ha) of follies and landscaped parkland grounds and rocky outcrops, based around the authentic Norman castle of Red Castle. The history of Hawkstone Park stretches back almost 800 years. In 1227 Henry de Audley, Sheriff of Shropshire and Staffordshire, built a sandstone castle on a natural outcrop of rock that was flanked on all sides by wide valleys. Hawkstone house, also known as the 'Great Hill', was established by Richard Hill of Hawkstone (1655-1727) .

There is a legend that one of the caves of Hawkstone Park was the burial ground of King Arthur.

1968 siege
In 1968 a farmer named John James held a woman hostage in a derelict cottage just north of the village. The siege lasted for 17 days, with James shooting at photographers and an armoured car sent in by the Army. The siege ended when the hostage threw James's shotgun out of a window, which allowed soldiers and police to storm the cottage. It remains the longest siege of a wanted person in UK history.

Transport
The village is just east of the A49, linking it with nearby Shrewsbury. The nearest railway station is Wem, with a usually two-hourly service south to Shrewsbury and north to Crewe. There are two bus stops in Weston, opposite and adjacent to the church, connecting the village with Shrewsbury and Wem.

See also
 Listed buildings in Weston-under-Redcastle
 Bury Walls

References

External links

Villages in Shropshire
Civil parishes in Shropshire